The 1960 Individual Speedway World Championship was the 15th edition of the official World Championship to determine the world champion rider.

The final was held on 17 September, in front of a 70,000 crowd at Wembley Stadium. In an extremely competitive final three riders tied for first place on 14 points before Ove Fundin won the ride off to claim his second world title. In the ride off Fundin defeated defending champion Ronnie Moore and former champion Peter Craven. Craven had earlier set a track record of 68.8 seconds in his first race.

First round
British & Commonwealth Qualifying – 64 riders to British First round
Scandinavian Qualifying – 16 to Nordic Final
Continental Qualifying – 16 to Continental Final

British & Commonwealth Qualifying

Scandinavian Qualifying

Continental Qualifying

Second round
British & Commonwealth First Round – 32 to British & Commonwealth semi-finals
Ove Fundin – seeded to European Final
Scandinavian Final – 7 to European Final
Continental Final – 8 to European Final

British & Commonwealth First Round

Nordic Final
16 June 1960
 Oslo
 First 7 to European Final plus 1 reserve

Continental Final
 3 July 1960
 Wieden
 First 8 to European Final

Third round
Ronnie Moore – seeded to World Final
British & Commonwealth semi-finals – 9 to World Final
European Final – 6 to World Final

British & Commonwealth semi finals
Top 9 riders based on points accumulated over two rides would progress

+ indicates qualifier for World Final (Bryan Elliott, Ron Johnston and Chum Taylor were the remaining three riders to qualify)

European Final
 14 August 1960
 Wrocław
 First 6 to World Final plus 1 reserve

World Final
17 September 1960
 London, Wembley Stadium

See also
 motorcycle speedway
 1960 Speedway World Team Cup

References

1960
World Individual
Individual Speedway World Championship
Individual Speedway World Championship
Speedway competitions in the United Kingdom